"Let Me Love You", is a song by South Korean singers Junggigo and Chanyeol, a member of K-pop group EXO. It was released on February 23, 2017 by Starship Entertainment.

Background and release 
On February 16, 2017, Junggigo and Chanyeol were announced to be collaborating on a duet titled "Let Me Love You". The song is described as a melodic love confession song. On the same day, Junggigo's agency Starship Entertainment released a teaser image for the upcoming duet with the details of the song's title and the date of its release. On February 20, a teaser of the two artists recording the song was released. On February 23, midnight, the single was officially released. The song hit the #1 spot on four music charts and #2 on two music charts after its release.

Music video

Track listing

Charts

Sales

Release history

References

External links 
 "Let Me Love You" music video on 1theK
 "Let Me Love You" making film

2017 songs
2017 singles
Korean-language songs
Starship Entertainment singles